For the state pageant affiliated with Miss Teen USA, see Miss Delaware Teen USA

The Miss Delaware's Teen competition is the pageant that selects the representative for the U.S. state of Delaware in the Miss America's Teen pageant.

Brynn String of Felton was crowned Miss Delaware's Outstanding Teen on April 24, 2022 at Milton Theater in Milton, Delaware. She competed for the title of Miss America's Outstanding Teen 2023 at the Hyatt Regency Dallas in Dallas, Texas on August 12, 2022.

In January of 2023, the official name of the pageant was changed from Miss Delaware’s Outstanding Teen, to Miss Delaware’s Teen, in accordance with the national pageant.

Results summary 

The year in parentheses indicates year of Miss America's Outstanding Teen competition the award/placement was garnered.

Awards

Preliminary awards 
 Preliminary Talent: Chelsea Betts (2008)

Non-finalist awards 
 Non-finalist Talent: Chelsea Betts (2008)

Other awards 
 Teens in Action Award Winners: Jaqueline Means (2020) (tie)
 Outstanding Achievement in Academic Life Award: Ashley Swanson (2017)
 Random Acts of Kindness Award: Grace Otley (2015)
 Spirit of America Award: Tanee' De Costa (2014)

Winners

References

External links
 Official website

Delaware
Beauty pageants in Delaware
Women in Delaware